Volcano (Italian title Vulcano) is a 1950 Italian drama film directed by William Dieterle and starring  Anna Magnani, Rossano Brazzi, and Geraldine Brooks. It was filmed on location on Salina Island, in the  Aeolian Islands, and in the city of Messina on Sicily.

Vulcano has been seen by some as a vehicle of revenge by Anna Magnani against her estranged lover at the time,  Italian film director Roberto Rossellini, who had chosen Ingrid Bergman to star in his film series about marriage, instead of her. Rossellini made his film Stromboli 
on the nearby volcanic island of Stromboli at the same time as Volcano was being made on Salina.

Both films were shot simultaneously in similar locales in the  Aeolian Islands, only 40 km apart; both actresses played independent-minded roles in a neorealist fashion. Life magazine wrote, "... in an atmosphere crackling with rivalry... Reporters were accredited, like war correspondents, to one or the other of the embattled camps.... Partisanship infected the Via Veneto (boulevard in Rome), where Magnaniacs and Bergmaniacs clashed frequently." However, Magnani still considered Rossellini the "greatest director she ever acted for".

Plot 
The film plot involves a former prostitute, Maddalena Natoli (played by Magnani), who was exiled to the island of her birth by the police. There, she suffers ostracism by the islanders, and she tries to defend the virtue of her younger sister from  the advances of a deep-sea diver. Vulcano runs for about 106 minutes.

Cast

Anna Magnani as Maddalena Natoli 
Rossano Brazzi as Donato
Geraldine Brooks as Maria
Eduardo Ciannelli as Giulio
Adriano Ambrogi as Don Antonio
Lucia Belfadel as Carmela
Cesare Giuffre as Alvaro
Enzo Staiola as Nino
Marcello Gatti

See also 
 The War of the Volcanoes — A 2012 Italian documentary film about the filming of Stromboli and Volcano

References

External links
 IMDB
  The Guardian, Arts

Italian drama films
1950 films
1950 drama films
Films directed by William Dieterle
Films shot in Italy
Films set in Sicily
Films set on islands
Films set in the Mediterranean Sea
Films scored by Enzo Masetti
Italian black-and-white films
1950s Italian-language films
English-language Italian films
1950s Italian films